Diodore of Tarsus (Greek Διόδωρος ὁ Ταρσεύς; died c. 390) was a Christian bishop, a monastic reformer, and a theologian.  A strong supporter of the orthodoxy of Nicaea, Diodore played a pivotal role in the Council of Constantinople and opposed the anti-Christian policies of Julian the Apostate.  Diodore founded one of the most influential centers of Christian thought in the early church, and many of his students became notable theologians in their own right.

Early life

Diodore was born into a noble family in the area of Antioch.  He received a classic philosophical education at the school of Athens, and very quickly after his education entered into the monastic life. During this period, Diodore's work focused on philosophical treatises and opposing Emperor Julian's attempts to restore paganism in the empire.  When an Arian named Leontius was made bishop of Antioch, Diodore and his friend Flavian (who later was himself appointed as bishop of Antioch) organized those who followed the Nicene orthodoxy outside the walls of the city for worship.  Those services are seen as the beginning of antiphonal singing in the church, a practice that became widespread among Christians.

During his time at the monastery in Antioch, Diodore came under the tutelage of Meletius of Antioch. Meletius was elected bishop in 360 and ordained Diodore as a priest. When the Antioch split into factions, Diodore, in turn, was a strong supporter of Meletius and of his move towards Nicene orthodoxy.

Diodore was noted for living with few possessions, being dependent on alms for food, frequently being imprisoned on account of his beliefs. His physical appearance was rough, but Chysostom described his expression as angelic.

Priesthood

During his priesthood, Diodore founded a monastery and catechetical school near the city of Antioch.  It was through this school that Diodore became the mentor of the controversial theologian and liturgist Theodore of Mopsuestia, but also of the legendary homileticist John Chrysostom.  This school would give rise to the unique Antiochene perspectives on both biblical interpretation and Christology known as the Antiochene School. Ultimately, taken to the extreme, the perspective set out for this school by Diodore led to the teachings of Nestorius, which were first condemned at the First Council of Ephesus in 431.

It was his role as the head of the Antiochene School which led to Diodore's exile in 372.  Banished to Armenia by Emperor Valens, Diodore encountered a fellow supporter of the Nicene faction, Basil of Caesarea, during his exile.  When Diodore returned from exile following the death of the emperor in 378, Basil was serving as the archbishop (or patriarch) of Caesarea, and he appointed Diodore as the bishop of Tarsus.

Episcopate

As bishop of the see of Tarsus, Diodore continued to speak out for the Nicene understanding of the relationship between the human and the divine in the person of Jesus Christ.  He actively opposed both the Arianism and the Apollinarianism of his day (Arius taught that Jesus Christ was not fully divine, Apollinaris of Laodicea spoke of the Incarnation in ways that left him open to the charge that Christ was not fully human).

Diodore played key roles in both the local Council of Antioch (379) and the ecumenical First Council of Constantinople in 381.  When their mentor Meletius died in 381, Diodore recommended his friend Flavian as his successor, thus prolonging the division in the Antiochene church. Diodore died around 394.

Theology

The Christology of Diodore was condemned as heretical by later generations, most explicitly at a local synod in Constantinople in 499 which described Diodore's views as Nestorian.  Certainly, a similarly negative view of Diodore was held by Cyril of Alexandria.  However, in his own generation Diodore was seen as someone who supported the orthodoxy of Nicaea, and in his official decree ratifying the actions of the First Council of Constantinople, Emperor Theodosius I described Diodore as a "champion of the faith."

The specifics of Diodore's theology are difficult to reconstruct, as all that remains of his works are fragments of uncertain provenance.
 Much of Diodore's theology has been inferred from the later statements of his students and the intellectual heirs of the Antiochene School.

According to the Universalist clergyman John Mather Austin (1855) Diodorus was also a Universalist since Saloman, Bishop of Bassorah in his Book of the Bee (1222) proclaimed the salvation of all men and cited the opinions of both Diodorus and Theodore of Mopsuestia in support of his view.

According to Universalist writer J. W. Hanson (1899) Diodorus believed that God's mercy would punish the wicked less than their sins deserved, inasmuch as his mercy gave the good more than they deserved and he denied that God would bestow immortality for the purpose of prolonging or perpetuating suffering.

See also

Christian Universalism
Early Christianity
Eastern Christianity
School of Antioch
Theoria

References

External links
 Diodore of Tarsus: Commentary on the Psalms
 Greek Opera Omnia by Migne Patrologia Graeca with analytical index

4th-century Romans
4th-century bishops in the Roman Empire
Christian universalist theologians
Doctors of the Church
390 deaths
4th-century Christian saints
4th-century Christian universalists
Christian universalist clergy
People from Antioch
Year of birth unknown